Wang Yang (born May 1, 1982 in Nanjing, Jiangsu) is a Chinese football player.

Club career
Wang was promoted to Jiangsu Sainty senior team square in 2002 but have just a few chances to appear in the league game. In 2004, he was loan to Uruguayan Primera División side Plaza Colonia for three months. Wang made his debut for Plaza Colonia on 14 September, in a 1 - 1 home draw with Rentistas. He scored his first senior league goal on his fifth appearance on 3 October. The goal he scored in 75th minute ensure Plaza Colonia even the score 2–2 with Nacional at home. He return to Jiangsu in December 2004.

Honours
Jiangsu Sainty
China League One: 2008

References

External links
Player profile at Sodasoccer.com

1982 births
Living people
Sportspeople from Nanjing
Chinese footballers
Chinese Super League players
China League One players
Footballers from Jiangsu
Jiangsu F.C. players
Plaza Colonia players
Chinese expatriate footballers
Expatriate footballers in Uruguay
Association football forwards